Kirill Sergeyevich Ladygin (born 17 December 1978 in Ekaterinburg) is a Russian professional auto racing driver. He is twice champion of the Russian LADA Revolution Cup in 2004 and 2006. In 2008 he competed in the FIA World Touring Car Championship when the Russian Bears Motorsport Team entered a third car, alongside Jaap van Lagen and Viktor Shapovalov. He drove in the final eight rounds of the season in a Lada 110, with a best placed race finish of nineteenth.

For the 2009 season he returned with Russian Bears team, this time with full manufacturer backing from Lada.

Racing record

Complete World Touring Car Championship results
(key) (Races in bold indicate pole position) (Races in italics indicate fastest lap)

24 Hours of Le Mans results

Complete WeatherTech SportsCar Championship results
(key) (Races in bold indicate pole position) (Races in italics indicate fastest lap)

Complete World Touring Car Cup results
(key) (Races in bold indicate pole position) (Races in italics indicate fastest lap)

‡ As Ladygin was a Wildcard entry, he was ineligible to score points.

References

External links

Russian Bears Motorsport Official Site.
WTCC official Site.
Ladygin Kirill official site.

Russian racing drivers
1978 births
Living people
World Touring Car Championship drivers
Blancpain Endurance Series drivers
International GT Open drivers
Sportspeople from Yekaterinburg
European Le Mans Series drivers
FIA World Endurance Championship drivers
24 Hours of Spa drivers
24 Hours of Le Mans drivers
24 Hours of Daytona drivers
WeatherTech SportsCar Championship drivers
World Touring Car Cup drivers
SMP Racing drivers
Russian Circuit Racing Series drivers
AF Corse drivers